"The Party Continues" is the lead single released from Jermaine Dupri's debut studio album, Life in 1472. Written and produced by Dupri himself, the song featured a verse from Da Brat and a chorus sung by Usher. The song samples “She’s Strange” by Cameo.

The single eventually became a top 40 hit, peaking at No. 29 on the Billboard Hot 100 during the week of March 28, 1998. It also was certified gold by the Recording Industry Association of America for sales of 500,000 copies and reached 92 on Billboard Year-End Hot 100 singles of 1998 as one of the years most popular and successful songs.

Single track listing
"The Party Continues"- 4:03  
"We Just Wanna Party"- 3:49  
"We Just Wanna Party" (Instrumental)- 3:49  
"The Party Continues" (Instrumental)- 4:02  
"The Party Continues" (Acappella)- 3:52

Charts and certifications

Weekly charts

Year-end charts

Certifications

|}

References

1998 songs
1998 debut singles
Jermaine Dupri songs
Da Brat songs
Usher (musician) songs
Song recordings produced by Jermaine Dupri
Songs written by Jermaine Dupri
Songs written by Da Brat
Songs written by Ronald Bell (musician)
Songs written by Larry Blackmon
Songs written by Claydes Charles Smith
Music videos directed by Paul Hunter (director)